Masracetus (from Arabic Masr, "Egypt", and Greek ketos, "whale") is an extinct genus of basilosaurid ancient whale known from the Late Eocene (Priabonian) of Egypt.

The lumbar vertebrae are large but relatively short (anteroposteriorly) compared to those of other archaeocetes; the diameter is almost the same as for Basilosaurus isis but the length is less than half of the latter. Masracetus is larger than Cynthiacetus, but it is suggested that the former might be synonymized as a junior synonym with the latter.

The species name honours Richard Markgraf, palaeontologist Ernst Stromer's fossil collector, who collected the type specimen in 1905.

Masracetus' type locality is the Birket Qarun Formation in Dimê (paleocoordinates ) north of lake Birket Qarun, but specimens have also been found in the Qattara Depression and Fayum.

Notes

References

 

Basilosauridae
Prehistoric cetacean genera
Fossil taxa described in 2007
Eocene mammals of Africa